WROA (1390 kHz) is a commercial AM radio station in Gulfport, Mississippi.  It is owned by the Dowdy & Dowdy Partnership and broadcasts a classic country radio format.  The radio studios and offices are on Lorraine Road in Gulfport.  WROA uses its FM dial position in its moniker, "Merle 100.1."  Merle refers to the late country artist Merle Haggard.

By day, WROA is powered at 900 watts non-directional.  To protect other stations on 1390 AM from interference at night, it reduces power to 35 watts at sunset.  The transmitter is on Bayou View Road in Gulfport, near the Biloxi River.  The tower is shared with WLGF 107.1 FM and WGBL 96.7 FM. WROA is also heard on FM translator W261CU at 100.1 MHz.  The translator broadcasts from the WGCM AM tower at 250 watts.

History
On , the station first signed on the air.  It was originally powered at 5,000 watts around the clock and carried a Top 40 format in the 1960s and 70s.  In 1959, it was acquired by Charles and Morgan Dowdy, who served as president and general manager, respectively.  Their names remain part of the current ownership's title.

In 1964, WROA got an FM simulcast, 107.1 WROA-FM (now WLGF).  The FM station later stopped simulcasting WROA and began airing a beautiful music format.

In March 2019, WROA changed its format from adult standards to classic country, branded as "Merle 100.1".

References

External links

ROA
Country radio stations in the United States
Radio stations established in 1955
1955 establishments in Mississippi